George Daly may refer to:

 George Daly (baseball) (1887–1957), professional baseball player
 George Daly (footballer) (born 1990), English football forward
 George Daly (music executive), music executive, songwriter, musician and producer

See also
St George Daly (1758–1829), lawyer
George Daley (disambiguation)